Fiji–France relations are the bilateral relations between France and Fiji. France has an embassy in Suva, but Fiji has no diplomatic representation in France. Relations were strained, due to France's condemnation of the coup d'état in Fiji in December 2006.

Previously, relations had primarily been centred on military cooperation, with France assisting Fiji in surveilling its maritime zone, and on development aid.

History
Diplomatic relations between the two countries were established in 1970.

In 1983, Fiji and France signed a treaty that set out the maritime boundary between Fiji and New Caledonia and the maritime boundary between Fiji and Wallis and Futuna.

In 2000, the French Government condemned the 2000 Fijian coup d'état.

French assistance
In 2004, France was the first foreign state to offer assistance to Fiji, sending naval aircraft from the nearby islands of New Caledonia taking part in efforts to locate several fishermen lost at sea.

See also 
 Foreign relations of Fiji 
 Foreign relations of France

References

External links
 French Ministry of Foreign Affairs

 
Bilateral relations of France
France